Marine Wing Support Squadron 273 (MWSS-273) is an aviation ground support unit of the United States Marine Corps. They are based out of Marine Corps Air Station Beaufort, South Carolina. The squadron falls under the command of Marine Aircraft Group 31 and the 2nd Marine Aircraft Wing.

Mission
Provide all essential aviation ground support to a designated fixed-wing component of a Marine Aviation Combat Element (ACE), and all supporting or attached elements of the Marine Air Control Group (MACG). This support includes: internal airfield communications, weather services, expeditionary airfield services, aircraft rescue and firefighting, aircraft and ground refueling, essential engineering services, motor transport, messing, chemical defense, security and law enforcement, airbase commandant functions, and explosive ordnance disposal. Additionally, in garrison MWSS-273 is tasked to supplement air station facilities and services provided by Marine Corps Air Station Beaufort, SC.

History
On 13 June 1986, MWSS-273 was formed at Marine Corps Air Station Beaufort, South Carolina, from elements of Marine Air Base Squadron 31, and Detachment Bravo, Marine Wing Support Group 27.

In 1989, MWSS-273 provided extensive disaster relief support to the city of Charleston, South Carolina, during the aftermath of Hurricane Hugo.

During The Persian Gulf War in 1991, Marines were reassigned from MWSS-272 and MWSS-274 to augment the squadron which was deployed in December 1990 and played a direct role in providing aviation ground support for UN forces conducting combat operations against Iraq. The Marines of MWSS-273 assisted in the construction of the largest expeditionary airfield in Marine Corps history at Al Khanjar, Saudi Arabia, in addition to several other major construction and transportation projects located at Ras Al Jubail, Ras Mishab, and on the Kuwait/Saudi Arabian border located at "LoneSome Dove". While conducting unit activities at Ras Mishab, the squadron received numerous FROG missile attacks from Iraqi enemy units located north of Ras Al Khafji during the first days of the "Air War Campaign".

Throughout the 1990s, the squadron provided extensive operational support for Aviano Air Base, Italy, NATO contingency operations Deny Flight and Provide Promise, Operation Uphold Democracy in Haiti, Operation Joint Forge in the Balkans, Operation Allied Force and Joint Task Force Noble Anvil in Taszar, Hungary, and numerous Marine Expeditionary Units. MWSS-273 has also provided support personnel for the ongoing Operation Enduring Freedom taking place in Afghanistan.

MWSS-273 deployed twice in squadron strength to Iraq in support of Operation Iraqi Freedom. The "Sweathogs" have established an impressive record as a forward deployed unit as they conducted 24-hour Aviation Ground Support operations at Al Asad Airbase, the Forward Operating Base at Al Qa'im and the Forward Arming and Refueling Point Mudayasis. During their most recent deployment, MWSS-273 was responsible for the tactical recovery of an unprecedented seven Coalition Aircraft.

From March to September 2012, MWSS 273 deployed to Helmand Province, Afghanistan, in support of Operation ENDURING FREEDOM.  The Squadron:  provided over 9 million gallons of fuel to over 25,000 aircraft and 2500 ground vehicles; built the largest High Power Run-Up in Marine Corps history; executed two aircraft recoveries including the first-ever combat recovery of an MV-22B Osprey; executed numerous Combat Logistics Patrols; constructed an air-site at Combat Outpost (COP) Shukvani; and prepared 1.78 million square feet of Aluminum Matting 2nd Generation for redeployment – all while providing first-class Aviation Ground Support to seven different air sites.  As a result of their efforts, the Sweathogs earned three unit awards:  Marine Corps Aviation Association's 2012 James E. Hatch Marine Wing Support Squadron of the Year; Marine Corps Engineer Association Engineer Company of the Year; and the American Petroleum Institute Tactical Unit of the Year.

Awards
Unit Awards include the Navy Commendation Streamer, the National Defense Service Streamer, and the Southwest Asia Streamer with three bronze stars.  MWSS-273 earned the James E. Hatch Marine Wing Support Squadron of the Year five times:  2000, 2005, 2007 and 2009, and 2012.

  Navy Unit Commendation Streamer
  National Defense Service Streamer
  Southwest Asia Service Streamer with three Bronze stars

See also

 United States Marine Corps Aviation
 Organization of the United States Marine Corps
 List of United States Marine Corps aviation support units

External links
 MWSS-273's Official Website

MWSS273